Sar Khareh or Sarkhareh or Sarkharreh or Sar Khowrreh or Saarkurreh may refer to:
 Sar Khareh-ye Olya
 Sar Khareh-ye Sofla